Kamačnik Bridge is located between the Vrbovsko and Ravna Gora interchanges of the A6 motorway in Gorski Kotar, Croatia, spanning Kamačnik stream. The bridge was designed by Zlatko Šavor. It consists of two parallel structures, both completed in 2003 by Konstruktor. The bridge is tolled within the A6 motorway ticket system and there are no separate toll plazas associated with use of the bridge.

Structure description
At this location the motorway route follows a horizontal curve therefore the transversal grade of the deck is slightly increased. It is constant and equals 4.2%, while elevation grade of the bridge is constant at 5.7%, sloping down towards Vrbovsko. The bridge is a box girder structure supporting the deck across three spans. The southbound bridge spans are  +  + . The northbound bridge spans are  +  + . The parallel bridge structures were built simultaneously.

Traffic volume
Traffic is regularly counted and reported by Autocesta Rijeka–Zagreb, operator of the viaduct and the A6 motorway where the structure is located, and published by Hrvatske ceste. Substantial variations between annual (AADT) and summer (ASDT) traffic volumes are attributed to the fact that the bridge carries substantial tourist traffic to the Adriatic resorts. The traffic count is performed using analysis of motorway toll ticket sales.

See also
List of bridges by length

References

Box girder bridges
Bridges completed in 2003
Toll bridges in Croatia
Buildings and structures in Primorje-Gorski Kotar County
Transport in Primorje-Gorski Kotar County